Steinhatchee is a Gulf coastal community in the southern part of Taylor County, Florida, United States. Just across the Steinhatchee River is Jena, which is in Dixie County. Steinhatchee is 19.27 miles north of the town of Cross City. The name Steinhatchee was derived from the Creek este enhvccē meaning river (hvccē) of person (este). Since the early 19th century, the village of Steinhatchee played an integral part in the foresting industry, particularly cedar used for making pencils, as well as fishing, crabbing and scalloping. The Steinhatchee River also flows by the community and into the Gulf of Mexico.

Demographics

2020 census
Note: the US Census treats Hispanic/Latino as an ethnic category. This table excludes Latinos from the racial categories and assigns them to a separate category. Hispanics/Latinos can be of any race.

As of the 2020 United States census, there were 1,049 people, 327 households, and 214 families residing in Steinhatchee.

2010 census
As of the 2010 census, there were 1,047 people. The population density was 327.4 people per square mile. There were 1,555 housing units. The racial makeup of the village was 98.7% White, 0.0% African American, 0.3% Native American, 0.3% Asian, and 0.2% from two or more races. Hispanic or Latino of any race were 1.9% of the population.

Ancestry
 the largest self-reported ancestry groups in Steinhatchee, Florida are:

References

Populated places in Taylor County, Florida
Populated coastal places in Florida on the Gulf of Mexico
Census-designated places in Florida